Steven Roberto Nesbit (born 13 February 1936) is a former New Zealand rugby union footballer. He played 13 matches, including 2 tests, in the position of first five-eighth for the All Blacks in 1960. Nesbit toured South Africa in 1960 and played in the second and third tests. He later went to the United States and toured New Zealand with a Californian Universities team.

See also
 List of alumni of St Peter's College, Auckland

References
 
 Ron Palenski (2007) The All Blackography, Hodder Moa. p. 357. 

1936 births
New Zealand people of Irish descent
New Zealand international rugby union players
Auckland rugby union players
Living people
New Zealand rugby union players
People educated at St Peter's College, Auckland
Rugby union fly-halves
Rugby union players from Auckland